The 1990 Stella Artois Championships was a men's tennis tournament played on grass courts at the Queen's Club in London in the United Kingdom and was part of the World Series of the 1990 ATP Tour. It was the 88th edition of the tournament and ran from 11 June through 18 June 1990. Ivan Lendl won the singles title.

Finals

Singles

 Ivan Lendl defeated  Boris Becker 6–3, 6–2
 It was Lendl's 4th title of the year and the 93rd of his career.

Doubles

 Jeremy Bates /  Kevin Curren defeated  Henri Leconte /  Ivan Lendl 6–2, 7–6
 It was Bates' only title of the year and the 2nd of his career. It was Curren's only title of the year and the 30th of his career.

References

External links
 Official website
 ATP tournament profile

 
Queen's Club Championships
Stella Artois Championships
Stella Artois Championships
Stella Artois Championships